Shaka Laka Boom Boom was an Indian television series. It was written and directed by Vijay Krishna Acharya. Merchandise  based on the series were also launched in markets.

Plot

The first season revolves around the central character, Sanju, finding a magical pencil, which has the ability to bring things drawn with it to life. The second season centres on an alien, Shaan, and his adventures with the magical pencil. The third season is about Sanju and Shaan's adventures in a magic school called Jadoo High, and in the fourth season, Sanju travels to the year 2022 to protect his family.

Cast
 Vishal Solankee as Sanju (2000–2001)
 Kinshuk Vaidya as Sanju (2002–2004)
 Rahul Joshi as Shaan/Neeraj's sidekick
 Kalyani Nerurkar as Zoya/Nito
 Hansika Motwani as Karuna/Shona
 Frank Anthony as Chandu
 Sainee Raj as Ritu
 Reema Vohra as Sanjana
 Adnan Jp as Jaggu
 Madhur Mittal as Tito
 Nikhil Yadav as Partho / Poisdon
 Mamik Singh / Rushad Rana as Adult Sanju / Sandros
 Tanvi Hegde  as Fruity
 Tushar Dalvi as Raj: Sanju's father (2000-2001)
 Sudha Chandran as Sanju's mother (2000-2001) 
 Lata Sabharwal as Sanju's Mother
 Ashiesh Roy as Partho's father
 Aditya Kapadia as Jhumru
 Amrapali Gupta as Kitty (2003-2004)
 Pallavi Rao as Karuna Maami
 Vaishali Thakkar as Lalita
 Romit Raaj as Karan (2003)
 Jennifer Winget as Piya (2003)
 Chahatt Khanna as Simple (Ex) / Jay Rani
 Tanmay Jahagirdar as Sunny
 Ishita Sharma as Simple
 Ronak Kotecha as Silly Point
 Mehul as Short Leg
 KK Goswami as Crystal
 Shehzad Khan as Tiger
 Sachin Singh as Monu
 Jagesh Mukati as Mangu
 Kurush Deboo as Colonel K.K. aka K.K. Uncle
 Bharati Achrekar as School Principal
 Jarrar Choudhry as Inspector Abhinav
 Ankit Shah as Sanju's cousin Sumit
 Ekta Jain

Broadcasting
It first aired as 30 episodes series on DD National channel from 15 October 2000. It was later taken up by Star Plus in 2001 and their version first premiered on 19 August 2002 with Kinshuk Vaidya as Sanju. The series also re-aired on Star Utsav, Disney Channel India, STAR One, Disney XD, Hungama TV and a Tamil dubbed version on Vijay TV.

References

External links 
 

StarPlus original programming
Indian children's television series
2000 Indian television series debuts
2004 Indian television series endings
Television about magic
Rose Audio Visuals
UTV Television
Indian fantasy television series
DD National original programming
Time travel in television
Disney XD (Indian TV channel) original programming
Television series set in the 2020s